Joseph Masiga (commonly known as Joe Masiga and JJ Masiga) is a former international Kenyan footballer and rugby player. Masiga played club football for the AFC Leopards, a team with roots in western Kenya. Masiga retired from active sports and is now a dentist in Nairobi.

References

Kenyan footballers
Year of birth missing (living people)
Living people
A.F.C. Leopards players
Association football forwards
Kenya international footballers
A.F.C. Leopards managers